Talk Is Cheap is the 1988 debut solo album by Keith Richards.

Talk Is Cheap may also refer to:

 "Talk Is Cheap" (song), by Chet Faker, 2014
 Talk Is Cheap (EP), by Dave Melillo, 2006
 "Talk Is Cheap", a song by Miley Cyrus from the 2009 EP The Time of Our Lives
 Four volumes of live spoken word albums by Henry Rollins:
 Talk Is Cheap Vol I (2003)
 Talk Is Cheap Vol II (2003)
 Talk Is Cheap Vol III (2004)
 Talk Is Cheap Vol IV (2004)